Travis Hocutt "Tommy" Tomlinson (September 17, 1913 – May 11, 2012) was mayor of Raleigh, North Carolina from 1965 to 1969.

Tomlinson was married to Margaret Waddell Tomlinson and had two sons, Travis H. Tomlinson Jr and William Parker Tomlinson.

In 1961 he was elected to serve on the Raleigh City Council. He was sworn-in on July 3.

Prior to serving as mayor, Travis "Tommy" Tomlinson founded Mayview Convalescent Home in Raleigh in 1957. His sons Travis and Parker currently run the home.

Tomlinson spent most of his spare time away from the public eye with his wife Margaret and their children at Kerr Lake on the Virginia-North Carolina border. Tomlinson was also an avid golfer and spent a lot of time in his later years golfing at the Carolina Country Club in Raleigh.

References

Mayors of Raleigh, North Carolina
Raleigh City Council members
1913 births
2012 deaths